The 1948 World Table Tennis Championships mixed doubles was the 15th edition of the mixed doubles championship.  

Dick Miles and Thelma Thall defeated Bohumil Váňa and Vlasta Pokorna-Depetrisová in the final by three sets to two.

Results

See also
List of World Table Tennis Championships medalists

References

-